Andris Lapsa (born 23 April 1968) is a retired Latvian football defender.

References

1968 births
Living people
Latvian footballers
FK Liepājas Metalurgs players
FK RFS players
FC Lantana Tallinn players
FK Ventspils players
Association football defenders
Latvia international footballers
Latvian expatriate footballers
Expatriate footballers in Estonia
Latvian expatriate sportspeople in Estonia
Meistriliiga players